The 1969 World Championship Tennis circuit was the second edition  of the (WCT) one of the two rival professional male tennis tours of 1969 the other being the 1969 Men's National Tennis League. The tour began on 3 February in Philadelphia, United States and ended on 29 April in Midland, Texas, United States.

Calendar

Legend

January 
No events

February

March 
No events

April 
No events

May

June 
No events

July 
No events

August 
No events

September 
No events

October

November 
No events

December 
No events

See also
 1969 Men's National Tennis League

References

Sources
 Association of Tennis Professionals:Results archive 1969
 Gitlin, Marty (2011). Billie Jean King: Tennis Star & Social Activist: Tennis Star & Social Activist. ABDO. .

External links
 www.thetennisbase.com

World Championship Tennis circuit seasons
World Championship Tennis